Cantarana is a comune (municipality) in the Province of Asti in the Italian region Piedmont, located about  southeast of Turin and about  west of Asti.

The municipality of Cantarana contains the frazioni (subdivisions, mainly villages and hamlets) Concentrico, Palazzasso, Torrazzo, Arboschio, Serralunga, Bricco dell'oca, Bricco Grosso, Bricco Aguggia, and Bricco Barrano.

Cantarana borders the following municipalities: Dusino San Michele, Ferrere, San Damiano d'Asti, Tigliole, Valfenera, and Villafranca d'Asti.

Demographic evolution

Twin towns — sister cities
Cantarana is twinned with:

  Chantraine, France (2007)

References

External links
 www.comune.cantarana.at.it

Cities and towns in Piedmont